FlexBook is a textbook authoring platform developed by the CK-12 Foundation launched in 2008, focused on textbooks for the K-12 market. Derived from the words "flexibility" and "textbook," a FlexBook allows users to produce and customize content by re-purposing educational content using different modules. FlexBooks can be designed to suit a learner's learning style, region, language, or level of skill, while adhering to the local education standards.

Features 
FlexBooks are designed to overcome some of the limitations of traditional textbooks. Anyone – including teachers, students, and parents – can adapt, create, and configure a FlexBook.

Some FlexBooks features include:
 Web-based collaborative model, where the user can create and edit content to produce a custom textbook
 Open Educational Resource(OER) which allows for remixing of content
 Available in PDF, HTML, ePub (for iPad) and AZW (for Kindle)

Licensing 
Each CK-12 FlexBook is created under Creative Commons Attribution-Non-Commercial 3.0 Unported (CC BY-NC 3.0) License, giving its author/user a right to share (i.e., right to copy, distribute and transmit the work) a right to remix (i.e., right to adapt the work). However, conditions of Attribution and Non-commercial apply.

Examples of use and collaboration 
In March 2009, FlexBook was acknowledged as “an adaptive, web-based set of instructional materials” by Virginia officials when members from Virginia's K-12 physics community along with university and industry volunteers developed an eleven chapter FlexBook titled “21st Century Physics FlexBook: A Compilation of Contemporary and Modern Technologies” in just 4 months.  In September 2010, NASA teamed up with CK-12 to add a chapter on “modeling and simulation” to the existing Physics FlexBook created earlier.   In November 2011, teachers from a school district, Anoka-Hennepin, Minnesota, reportedly, saved the district $175,000 by writing their own online textbook instead of buying $65 textbooks – earlier, costing the district to the tune of $200,000. Wolfram has teamed up with CK-12 to produce interactive FlexBooks with Wolfram demonstrations embedded into the FlexBooks.

See also 
 OpenCourseWare
 Open educational resources
 Open textbook
 Bookboon
 China Open Resources for Education
 Connexions
 Curriki
 Flat World Knowledge
 Free High School Science Texts South Africa
 Khan Academy
 MIT OpenCourseWare
 National Programme on Technology Enhanced Learning India
 Open.Michigan
 Tufts OpenCourseWare

References

External links 
 

Educational software
Open content projects